Vikram Partap Singh Sandhu (born 16 January 2002) is an Indian professional footballer who plays as a forward for Indian Super League club Mumbai City.

Club career

Earlier career
Singh started his youth career at the Chandigarh Football Academy and progressed to the senior set-up in 2018. He later moved to Indian Arrows and participated in I-League, where he played until 2020 and scored 5 goals in 27 matches.

Mumbai City
In October 2020, Mumbai City announced the signing of Singh ahead of the upcoming 2020–21 Indian Super League season. He joined the Islanders on a deal which will keep him at the club until 2023, with an option to extend for a further year. On 1 December 2021, he scored a brace against ATK Mohun Bagan in their 5–1 win. He was later included in the club's 2022 AFC Champions League squad.

International career
He is known for his goal-scoring instincts during his tenure in India U-16 team for his braces and hat-tricks. His goal against Vietnam led to India's first win in 2018 AFC U-16 Championship in Malaysia.

With India U-20 team, Singh participated in 2019 OFC Youth Development Tournament held in Vanuatu, and they emerged champions as he scored two goals.

He debuted for India U-23 team on 24 October 2021 in AFC U-23 Championship 2022 Qualifiers in first game against Oman. He scored a goal against Oman on 37th minute helping India to a 2–0 lead, with India going on to win the game 2–1.

Career statistics

Club

Honours

India U-15
SAFF U-15 Championship: 2017

India U-20
OFC Youth Development Tournament: 2019
SAFF U-18 Championship: 2019

Mumbai City
Indian Super League: 2020–21
Indian Super League League Winner's Shield: 2020–21
 Durand Cup runner-up: 2022

Individual
 AIFF Emerging Player of the Year: 2021–22
 2017 SAFF U-15 Championship Player of the tournament
 2019 OFC Youth Development Tournament Top goalscorer

References

External links
Vikram Pratap Singh at Indian Super League
Vikram Pratap Singh at Khel Now

2002 births
Living people
Indian footballers
Association football forwards
RoundGlass Punjab FC players
Indian Arrows players
I-League players
Mumbai City FC players
India youth international footballers
Indian Super League players
Footballers from Chandigarh